Yakov Abramovich Popok (1894–1938) served as the fifth first secretary of the Communist Party of the Turkmen SSR. His term began in August 1930, replacing Grigory Aronshtam. He fell ill in early 1937, causing him to resign on 15 April. He died the following year in the Great Purge. Deputy Secretary Anna Mukhamedov held his position for two days, until a replacement, Yakov Chubin, was selected.

References
Rulers of Soviet Republics

1894 births
1938 deaths
People from Smolensk Oblast
People from Mstislavsky Uyezd
Russian Jews
Party leaders of the Soviet Union
Communist Party of Turkmenistan politicians
Sverdlov Communist University alumni
Recipients of the Order of Lenin
Jews from the Russian Empire
Soviet Jews
Jewish Russian politicians
Jewish socialists
First convocation members of the Soviet of the Union
People executed by the Soviet Union by firearm
Great Purge victims from Russia
Jews executed by the Soviet Union
Executed people from Smolensk Oblast